The 2019 Campeonato Paulista Série A3 was the 27th season of the third level of the São Paulo state league under its current title and the 66th season overall.

Team changes 
The following teams have changed division since the 2018 season.

To Série A3
Promoted from Segunda Divisão
 Primavera
 Comercial

Relegated from Série A2
 Audax
 Batatais

From Série A3
Promoted to Série A2
 Atibaia
 Portuguesa Santista

Relegated to Segunda Divisão
 Rio Branco
 Marília
 União Barbarense
 Manthiqueira
 Matonense
 Mogi Mirim

Stadiums

League table

Knockout stage

Bracket

Season statistics

Top scorers

References 

São Paulo
Campeonato Paulista seasons
2019 in Brazilian football